Dr. Indira Etwaroo (award-winning producer, director, scholar, and non-profit arts leader) has worked with cultural institutions across the country and the world to explore the complex intersections between community, performing arts, and the conversations-of-our-time, leading towards models of institutional thrivability, multiplatform content innovation, and models of diversity and inclusion in the 21st century. In 2009, Dr. Etwaroo was listed in the Forty Under 40 Dynamic Achievers Award.

Early life and education
Indira Etwaroo as born in Washington DC and grew up in Newport News, Virginia. Her parents are the late Neville Narwani Etwaroo and Dorothy Rose Etwaroo. Her mother was a pianist.

Prior to joining the nonprofit world, Indira received her PhD in cultural studies in dance and a master's degree in dance education from Temple University, where she taught undergraduate and graduate lecture courses. Indira also received her bachelor's degree in music from Longwood University, where she served as principal flutist and right after graduation, she worked in Tegucigalpa, Honduras, as a teacher. When she returned to the United States, she taught in Richmond, Virginia.

Etwaroo performed at the National Black Theatre Festival in 1995 and 1997 under the direction of African American Theater pioneer Ernie McClintock. In 2003, Dr. Etwaroo worked for a year in Addis Ababa, Ethiopia as a Fulbright Scholar where she collaborated with a group of refugee Somali women and children "to explore the performance aesthetics that surround the controversial practice of female genital cutting." For her endeavors, Dr. Etwaroo received the Emerging Doctoral Scholar Award and the Graduate Research Award from the National Congress on Research in Dance. She has also served as Adjunct Professor teaching Dance, Movement and Pluralism, and Research Methods at Temple University.

Dr. Etwaroo is currently an adjunct professor at New York University where she developed the course and teaches Leading Performing Arts Institutions in the 21st Century.

Work

Dr. Etwaroo has established a profound and unwavering commitment to championing the need for equity in cultural institutions. Indira was tapped as one of five leaders out of over 250 institutions of color in NYC to serve on the advisory committee with a collective of funders to understand the health and viability of African, Latinx, Asian, Arab, and Native American (ALAANA) arts groups in New York City and create the Mosaic Network and Fund to direct more resources to arts groups that are led by, created for, and accountable to ALAANA people with values rooted in racial equity. Dr. Etwaroo also led efforts to conceptualize and raise funds for the first-ever national strategic plan for Black theaters across the nation, entitled The Black Seed in partnership with Dr. Monica Ndounou, Shay Wafer and Gary Anderso, providing over $10 million in funding.

Indira Etwaroo currently serves as the Director of the Steve Jobs Theater at Apple in Cupertino, California. Prior to that appointment, Dr. Etwaroo was a major force for innovation and inclusion in multiplatform content development and the public radio field for 10 years. Dr. Etwaroo was the Founding Executive Producer of the multiplatform, state-of-the-art Jerome L. Greene Performance Space at New York Public Radio, the largest public radio station in the nation that reaches 16 million listeners on air and digitally.  In 2006, she was charged with creating New York Public Radio's first-ever live space in Lower Manhattan to bring audiences face-to-face with dynamic and diverse content.  In addition to leading the organization through the development, construction, and vision for a multiplatform space that would reach diverse audiences on the street, on air and online, she developed new revenue streams and, within three years of The Greene Space's launch, created a self-sustaining business model through private and government funding, ticketing, corporate sponsorship and space rental revenue streams, as well as an overall multiplatform content strategy.  Of note, she conceptualized and executive produced the first-ever seminal recordings of August Wilson's entire American Century Cycle (2013) in partnership with Constanza Romero with Artistic Directors Tony Award-winner Ruben Santiago Hudson and Tony Award-nominee Stephen McKinley Henderson; the American Radio Broadcast Premiere of Zora Neale Hurston's Their Eyes Were Watching God narrated by Phylicia Rashad (2012); and the breakout Talent Quest Series, Battle of the Boroughs, which excavated hundreds of musicians from all walks of life from throughout New York City.  The Greene Space now stands as an exemplary model to the public radio system for reaching ethnically diverse and younger audiences through multiplatform content. Dr. Etwaroo joined NPR in 2013 as Founding Executive Producer and Director of NPR Presents to develop a national live events strategy to bring on air and online content to audiences across the nation with national tours like Water +, conceptualized by Etwaroo and directed by Tony Award-Winner Kenny Leon.  Etwaroo also worked with BAM's Department of Education and Humanities, heading up and developing key program initiatives. She serves on the COVID-19 Mayoral Advisory Task Force for Arts, Culture, and Tourism.

"It has taken years to get to this moment", Indira Etwaroo, the executive producer of the project, said in a statement. "Ms. Etwaroo conceptualized the [August Wilson American Century Cycle] project and worked with Constanza Romero, Mr. Wilson's widow and executor of his estate, to secure the rights. Wilson's American Century Cycle captures 100 years of African American life through the searing, poetic, personal stories of everyday people", Etwaroo said. "The significance of it all coming to fruition during the year of the 150th anniversary of the Emancipation Proclamation and the 50th anniversary of the March on Washington is not lost on any of us." – The New York Times, 2013

In 2015, Dr. Etwaroo joined Bedford Stuyvesant Restoration Corporation, the first community development corporation in the nation founded by Robert F. Kennedy and Jacob Javits, to provide the artistic and curatorial vision, strategic direction, fundraising-leadership, management and partnership expertise for one of Brooklyn's cultural anchors with the AUDELCO and Obie Award-winning Billie Holiday Theatre as its artistic centerpiece. In her five-year tenure, she led the institution through a multi-million-dollar complete renovation of the theater, converted over 6,000 sq ft of ground floor space into essential rehearsal space where hundreds of artists of African descent can build new works and millions of Brooklyn community members can now witness "art in motion", and sparked a radical audience transformation to expand audiences from 40,000 to 82,000 annually.  With a pivot from community arts to world-class arts for the community, The Billie  - in the past several seasons alone - has been nominated for a total of 32 AUDELCO Awards and taken top honors four times - three times for Best Play of the Year in 2017, 2018 and 2019 and once for Best Revival of the Year in 2018. Dr. Etwaroo has launched signature programming, including 50in50: Writing Ourselves Into Existence, with a curatorial statement provided by Dominique Morriseau, which has presented the writings of over one thousand Black women writers-to-date from across the world, as well as the Black Arts Institute, a five-week training program at The Billie in partnership with Stella Adler Studio of Acting that gives college and university theatre students of African descent from across the country and world the opportunity to take a deep dive into the canon of Black Theater and the context that shaped those works with founding faculty that includes Phylicia Rashad, Sonia Sanchez, Stephen McKinley Henderson, Ruben Santiago-Hudson, and Michele Shay. She led the first Black Lives Matter mural in NYC and state, located right in front of The Billie Holiday Theatre at Fulton Street
(Photo by Artist/Photographer Ian Lyn http://ianlynphotography.com

Indira has received many awards and honors for her work, including being named one of the "40 under 40" national leaders by The Network Journal in 2009 and being tapped as a Fulbright Scholar where she lived in Addis Ababa, Ethiopia in 2004 with her daughter Zenzele to conduct research with a collective of Somali women and girls.  Indira has produced over a thousand events with noted artists, newsmakers, and changemakers from across the globe on timely topical issues from the 2010 earthquake in Haiti to the Egyptian Revolution of 2011 to a talk with Broadway director and cast of Death of a Salesman - the late Mike Nichols and Philip Seymour Hoffman - to a concert and conversation with Wyclef Jean to a concert and talk with musician, Sting to the all-Black Broadway cast of Streetcar Named Desire. She has also directed and/or choreographed over thirty works, including the 10-Year Anniversary of Ernie McClintock's The Collard Green: Contributions by Cornbread Divas, the World Premiere of A Walk into Slavery written by Hollis King and Carl Hancock Rux, and the premiere of Omari Hardwick's One-Man show HerO. She Associate Directed with Kenny Leon the first all-Black production of Much Ado About Nothing, Shakespeare in the Park at the Delacorte in its 55-year history and worked with Leon again as the dramaturg for the historic revival of A Soldier's Play on Broadway.

Dr. Indira Etwaroo is the author of scholarly articles and chapters used in universities across the country on the topic of performance and inclusion; most recently contributing a chapter for the 2019, Hot Feet: African Dance in the 21st Century, edited by Dr. Kariamu Welsh with a foreword by Harry Belafonte and Danny Glover and published by Illinois University Press.

References 

Living people
Longwood University alumni
Temple University alumni
Year of birth missing (living people)